The 2011 IIHF World Women's U18 Championship was the fourth junior female world ice hockey championships. It was held from January 1 through January 8, 2011, in Stockholm, Sweden. The championship was the Under-18 junior ice hockey edition of the women worlds, organized by the International Ice Hockey Federation (IIHF).

Eight teams played in the top division, and six teams played in Division I.

Top Division

Group stage

Group A 

All times local (CET/UTC+1)

Group B 

All times local (CET/UTC+1)

Relegation round
Best of three.

 is relegated to Division I for the 2012 IIHF World Women's U18 Championship.

Final Round

* Decided in Overtime.

Quarterfinals

Semifinals

5th place game

Bronze medal game

Gold medal game

Ranking and statistics

Final standings

Scoring leaders
List shows the top skaters sorted by points, then goals. If the list exceeds 10 skaters because of a tie in points, all of the tied skaters are shown.
GP = Games played; G = Goals; A = Assists; Pts = Points; +/− = Plus/minus; PIM = Penalties in minutes; POS = PositionSource:

Leading goaltenders
Only the top five goaltenders, based on save percentage, who have played 40% of their team's minutes are included in this list.
TOI = Time on ice (minutes:seconds); GA = Goals against; GAA = Goals against average; Sv% = Save percentage; SO = ShutoutsSource:

Tournament awards
Best players selected by the directorate:
Best Goaltender:  Isabella Portnoj
Best Defenceman:  Milica McMillen
Best Forward:   Alex Carpenter
Source:

Division I

The tournament was held in Dmitrov, Russia, from 28 March to 3 April 2011.

See also
2011 IIHF World U18 Championships (Men)
2011 World Junior Ice Hockey Championships (Men)

References

External links
 

IIHF World Women's U18 Championships
2011 in ice hockey
World
2011
Wor
January 2011 sports events in Europe
Women's ice hockey competitions in Sweden
2011 in Swedish women's sport
2010s in Stockholm
International sports competitions in Stockholm